Adam Beattie Gunn (December 23, 1870 – August 17, 1935) was a Scottish-American athlete who competed mainly in the "All rounder", the forerunner of today's Decathlon. Gunn took first place in the Amateur Athletic Union's U.S. All-around championships in 1901 and 1902. The 1901 title was won in Buffalo, New York which Gunn adopted as his home town.

He competed for the United States in the 1904 Summer Olympics held in St. Louis, Missouri in the All rounder which consisted of 100 y run, shot put, high jump, 880 y walk, hammer throw, pole vault, 120 y hurdles, 56 pounds weight throw, long jump and 1 mile run, where he won the Silver medal.

He was born in the Sutherland village of Golspie, in the Highlands of Scotland.

References

External links
 
 Adam B. Gunn, Olympic Silver Medalist

1870 births
1935 deaths
American male decathletes
Olympic silver medalists for the United States in track and field
Athletes (track and field) at the 1904 Summer Olympics
Track and field athletes from Buffalo, New York
Scottish emigrants to the United States
Medalists at the 1904 Summer Olympics
People from Golspie